This is a list of Formula Renault 2.0 Champions, a list of racing drivers who have been named champions in a variety of Formula Renault championships. This list does not include champions of the World Series by Renault or Formula V6 Asia competitions.

By year

Europe

America and Asia

Multiple-champions

Notes

champions
Formula Renault 2.0 champions